Addington Park is a park situated in Addington in the London Borough of Croydon.

History 
The park was originally part of the manor of Addington and the area was used by Henry VIII for hunting purposes. The original manor house was replaced in 1768 by Addington Palace and the  grounds were laid out by Capability Brown in 1781.

Most of the 24.50 acres which make up the public park were purchased from the owners of the  Addington Palace Estate by Croydon Council in 1930. Tennis courts were purchased after World War II.

Transportation
The park is located next to Addington Interchange which is a tram and bus interchange. It is also served by Gravel Hill tram stop

Facilities

Historic landscaping
Car parking
Cricket and football pitches
Tennis courts
Children's playground

See also
List of Parks and Open Spaces in Croydon
Addington Hills
Ashburton Park
Woodside Green

References

External links
London Borough of Croydon website / Addington Park
London Borough of Croydon; Addington Park history

Parks and open spaces in the London Borough of Croydon